Club Deportivo Olímpic de Xàtiva is a Spanish football team based in Xàtiva, in the Valencian Community. Founded in 1932 it currently plays in Regional Preferente, holding home games at Campo de Futbol La Murta.

History
Football in Xàtiva can be traced back to 1924 when a number of clubs from the city played in the Valencian regional leagues. Club Deportivo Olímpic was founded in 1932, and from that date on remained the main representative of the city. During the Spanish Civil War, it played in many regional competitions and won promotion to the Tercera División in 1943, lasting one season, but being promoted again in 1945; due to financial difficulties the club forfeited from the competition in 1951, only returning five years later.

For the next decade Olímpic was a dominant force in the third level, successively finishing in the top five and reaching the Segunda División promotion play-offs three times, being ousted by Gimnàstic de Tarragona in 1959, CD Málaga in 1960 and CD Atlético Baleares in 1961. These disappointments led to a slow descent which culminated in relegation to the regional championships, following the restructuring of the divisions in 1968.

Olímpic returned to the third division – renamed Segunda División B – in 1977, finishing in eighth position in its debut season but bottom of the charts in the following campaign, eventually slipping back to Preferente in 1982. It returned to the third tier in 1987–88 under the guidance of coach Benito Floro (later of Real Madrid), and the club finished in a best-ever fourth position in the category, missing out on promotion in the final day of the season against UD Alzira. In 1991 it returned to level four, remaining there for the vast majority of the following two decades, with five years spent in the regional leagues.

At the end of the 2010–11 season, after three unsuccessful attempts in the playoffs, Olímpic de Xàtiva returned to the third division after an absence of 20 years, after successively ousting Atlético Malagueño, CD Anguiano and CD Izarra. On 7 December 2013, with the side still in that level, it faced Real Madrid in the Copa del Rey's round-of-32, managing a 0–0 home draw in the first leg.

On March 2018, it was announced that Indian I-League club Sudeva Delhi has bought the majority  stakes of the club.

Season to season

11 seasons in Segunda División B
46 seasons in Tercera División
1 season in Tercera División RFEF

Selected former players
Note: this list includes players that have played at least 100 league games and/or have reached international status.
 Edwin Congo
 Alberto
 Raúl Fabiani
 Nata
 Ángel Guirado
 Francis

Selected former coaches
 Benito Floro (1987–1988)

Stadium
Sudeva Olimpic holds home matches at Campo de Futbol La Murta, with a capacity of 9,000 spectators, 2,000 seated. The pitch dimensions are 103 x 63m, and the site served as a football field since the late 1920s/early 1930s, being the only home ground the club used.

Until 1960 the ground was very basic, consisting of a simple uncovered tribune on the east side of the ground and a single step around the pitch. In the 1960–61 season leading player Richart was transferred to Sporting de Gijón, and it is said that this money was used to build the popular terrace at the north end of the ground. Simple improvements to the terracing occurred during the 1980s, but the next major improvement was the building of a new covered main stand in 2000; plastic seats and an electronic scoreboard were added in 2002, and artificial turf was installed in October 2005.

Affiliated clubs
The following club is currently affiliated with Sudeva Olimpic:
  Sudeva Delhi FC (2018–present)

See also
 List of football clubs in Spain

References

External links
Official website 

Futbolme team profile 

 
Association football clubs established in 1932
Football clubs in the Valencian Community
1932 establishments in Spain
Xàtiva